Amir Hamitov (born 4 February 1975) is a Russian political figure and a deputy of the 8th State Duma.
 
After graduating from the Russian Presidential Academy of National Economy and Public Administration, Hamitov engaged in business and was a co-founder of the Moscow Uniled CJSC and Uniled-tech, and Non-bank credit organization "Mobile card" LLC. Since September 2021, he has served as deputy of the 8th State Duma. On 12 October 2021 he was appointed Deputy Chairman of the State Duma Committee on Physical Culture and Sports.

References
 

 

1975 births
Living people
New People politicians
21st-century Russian politicians
Eighth convocation members of the State Duma (Russian Federation)